Zhangzizhong Lu Station is a station on Line 5 of the Beijing Subway. Zhangzizhonglu, literally meaning Zhang Zizhong Road, is named after general Zhang Zizhong, who died in the Second Sino-Japanese War. It will become a transfer station for Line 3 in the future.

Station Layout 
The station has an underground island platform.

Exits
There are four exits, lettered A, B, C, and D. Exit D is accessible.

References

External links
 

Beijing Subway stations in Dongcheng District